The World Birding Center is the official title given to a combined nine parks and nature preserves in the Rio Grande Valley region of Texas managed by a partnership of the Texas Parks and Wildlife Department, the United States Fish and Wildlife Service, and the local communities in which the parks reside. The stated mission of the World Birding Center is to "protect native habitat while increasing the understanding and appreciation of the birds and wildlife", with an additional emphasis on promoting local economic development through ecotourism.

Features 

Parks and preserves

Bentsen-Rio Grande Valley State Park 

The Bentsen-Rio Grande Valley State Park is known for impressive bird-viewing opportunities, with 358 species documented within the park boundaries. The  park was acquired in 1944 for the price of US$1 from the Bentsen family with the stipulation that it be used "solely for Public Park purposes." It was initially preserved from agricultural use by the family due to the presence of beautiful native Ebony trees.

The World Birding Center has its headquarters at this site, and the structures were designed by the Lake Flato architectural firm, known for their attention to sustainable architecture. The resulting buildings and grounds were named one of the top ten green designs for 2006 by the American Institute of Architects Committee on the Environment (AIA/COTE).

Edinburg Scenic Wetlands World Birding Center 
A  site situated within a municipal park in the city of Edinburg, Texas. Notable in that it was developed through re-vegetation of agricultural lands and exists entirely in an urban setting.

Estero Llano Grande State Park 
A recently expanded 230-acre park built partially on reclaimed agricultural land. Known best for its wetlands including "Alligator Lake" (a restored oxbow of the Arroyo Colorado), which is named for both the presence alligators, as well as its shape. The review of park alligator safety tips is recommended.

Harlingen Arroyo Colorado World Birding Center 
An urban center consisting of multiple close by parks which follow the Arroyo Colorado waterway, with Harlingen Thicket Park bordering the west side, and the Hugh Ramsey Nature Park on the east, and McKelvey park situated in between. There are numerous paved and unpaved hike and bike trails within the parks, but they do not completely interconnect the site.

Old Hidalgo Pumphouse Museum and World Birding Center 
Historic museum and birding center featuring five-mile hike and bike trail, as well as historic steam-powered irrigation pump house. Visitors can still view the antique boilers and infrastructure used to irrigate the farmland around the city of Hidalgo during the early 20th century.

Quinta Mazatlan Historical Mansion and World Birding Center 
An urban 20-acre estate preserve centered around a Spanish Revival Style mansion with a mission focused on education and environmental stewardship. The site participates in the education of 10,000 students annually. Also features "Native Plant Walks" and programs on natural history of the Rio Grande Valley for the general public.

Resaca de la Palma State Park 
Site of the historical Battle of Resaca de la Palma early in the Mexican–American War, the park features  of native semi-tropical brushland. There are many opportunities for guided wildlife viewing, including an interpretive "Nature Tram Tour", as well as hiking and biking trails.

Roma Bluffs World Birding Center 
Located in the historic city of Roma, Texas, which was once the furthest port upstream for steamboats on the Rio Grande. A small site, it is also the westernmost point of the World Birding Center.

South Padre Island Birding and Nature Center 

A  bayside preserve which features a five-story viewing tower facing the Laguna Madre Bay, more than half a mile of boardwalk, and a man-made wetland using fresh water from the island's adjacent water treatment plant, which serves to attract numerous species of local and migrant birds.

Educational outreach 

The World Birding Center does provide numerous forms of educational outreach including "Nature Camp" for children, a website photo gallery and sound library of commonly encountered birds for the region, and individually tailored bird "checklists" for each of their sites.

See also
Great Texas Coastal Birding Trail
Laguna Atascosa National Wildlife Refuge
Sabal Palm Sanctuary
Santa Ana National Wildlife Refuge

References

External links
 

Rio Grande
Ornithological organizations in the United States
Bird sanctuaries of the United States
Harlingen, Texas
Protected areas of Cameron County, Texas
Protected areas of Hidalgo County, Texas
Protected areas of Starr County, Texas
Brownsville, Texas